Raymond Elswood Davis (September 14, 1907 – August 26, 1972) was an American football player and coach of football and baseball. He was the head football and baseball coach at Louisiana Polytechnic Institute—now known as Louisiana Tech University—in 1939. Davis played college football at Howard College—now known as Samford University—in Homewood, Alabama. He played professionally in the National Football League (NFL) with the Portsmouth Spartans in 1932 and 1933. David returned to his alma mater, Howard, in 1934, where he served as line coach for the football team under head coaches Clyde Propst and Billy Bancroft.

Head coaching record

Football

References

External links
 
 

1907 births
1972 deaths
American football centers
American football ends
American football guards
American football tackles
Louisiana Tech Bulldogs baseball coaches
Louisiana Tech Bulldogs football coaches
Portsmouth Spartans players
Samford Bulldogs football coaches
Samford Bulldogs football players
Sportspeople from Anniston, Alabama
Sportspeople from Birmingham, Alabama
Coaches of American football from Alabama
Players of American football from Birmingham, Alabama